Ebenezer Calendar (1912-1985), or Ebenezer Calender, was a Sierra Leone Creole palm-wine musician who popularized Creole gumbe and palm-wine music in Sierra Leone and West Africa. Calendar heavily influenced Dr Oloh and other Sierra Leonean musicians. Ebenezer Calendar formed the music group, Ebenezer Calendar & His Maringa Band which was popular between the early to middle twentieth centuries.

Early life
Ebenezer Calendar was born in 1912 to a Barbadian or Jamaican father and a Creole mother in Freetown, Sierra Leone and he attended local schools and he was a trained a carpenter and coffin maker following the completion of his education.

Music
Calendar formed the group, Ebenezer Calendar & His Maringa Band in the early to middle twentieth century, which popularized Creole styles of gumbe and palm-wine music.

Death
Calendar died in Freetown, Sierra Leone in 1985.

References
http://www.sierra-leone.org/Heroes/heroes10.html
http://sierraleonejournal.org/calender.html

1912 births
1985 deaths
Sierra Leonean music
Sierra Leone Creole people
People of Sierra Leone Creole descent
Sierra Leonean people of Caribbean descent
Sierra Leonean people of Barbadian descent